Armenak (in Armenian Արմենակ), alternatively pronounced Armenag in Western Armenian may refer to:

Armenak
Armenak Alachachian (1930–2017), Egyptian-born Soviet Armenian basketball player and coach. Later immigrated to Canada
Armenak Arzrouni (1901–1963), better known by the mononym Armand, Egyptian Armenian photographer
Armenak Ghazarian (1864–1904), better known as Hrayr Dzhoghk, Armenian military leader and strategist, fedayee, statesman and teacher, part of the Armenian national liberation movement
Armenak Petrosyan (born 1973), Armenian footballer and goalkeeper
Armenak "Aram" Yaltyryan (1914–1999), Soviet lightweight wrestler of Armenian origin
Armenak Yekarian (1870–1926), Armenian military leader and fedayee

Armenag
Armenag K. Bedevian, Effendi, from Ottoman Armenian descent, later Director of Gizeh Research Farm, Egypt
Armenag Haigazian (1870–1921), Ottoman Armenian educator

Armenian masculine given names